For Musicians Only is a 1958 jazz album by Dizzy Gillespie, Stan Getz and Sonny Stitt incorporating bebop influences.

Recorded in Los Angeles, California on October 16, 1956, it has been described as the "real thing, no pretense". Bob Levey, son of drummer Stan Levey, told an interviewer how his father described the session:

The story behind this from my dad's point of view is that everything was done in one take--no 2nd takes, no overdubbing. He had spent the whole day recording for TV, Mission Impossible Mannix etc. So he thought 'a date with Stan Getz...this should be pretty laid back'.

Well nothing could be further from the truth, he said. "The count-offs were breathtaking, but once they got thru Bebop, everything settled down". His favorite was Wee (Allen's Alley). It was virtually a live, real bebop session, nothing worked out, just play by the seat of your pants or get off the bandstand. Like it or not that was the way it was with Bird and those cats, the real thing no pretense.

The album is known for the front line's winding, intricate solos. This has led to praise for the back line, particularly bassist Ray Brown, for keeping some semblance of the original tune going behind the solos.

Track listing
"Bebop" (Gillespie) - 12:48
"Dark Eyes" (Traditional) - 12:10
"Wee (Allen's Alley)" (Denzil Best, Gillespie) - 8:28
"Lover Come Back to Me" (Sigmund Romberg, Oscar Hammerstein II) - 9:33
"Dark Eyes" [Alternate Take] - 9:50 Bonus track on CD reissue

Personnel
Dizzy Gillespie - trumpet
Sonny Stitt - alto saxophone
Stan Getz - tenor saxophone
John Lewis - piano
Herb Ellis - guitar
Ray Brown - bass
Stan Levey - drums

References 

1958 albums
Stan Getz albums
Dizzy Gillespie albums
Sonny Stitt albums
Albums produced by Norman Granz
Albums recorded at Radio Recorders
Verve Records albums